William Dudley  (born 4 March 1947 in London, England) is a British theatre designer.

Dudley is the son of William Stuart Dudley and his wife Dorothy Irene (née Stacey). He was educated at Saint Martin's School of Art and the Slade School of Art. He is a member of the Society of British Theatre Designers. He is married to the theatre director Lucy Bailey.

National Life Stories conducted an oral history interview (C1173/27) with Dudley in 2007–2008 for its An Oral History of Theatre Design collection held by the British Library.

Career
He designed his first production in October 1970, Hamlet for Nottingham Playhouse. Since then, he has designed the following productions:

The Duchess of Malfi (Royal Court) – 1971
Man Is Man, Bertolt Brecht (Royal Court) – 1971
Anarchist (Royal Court Upstairs) – 1971
 Tyger (co-designed for the National Theatre) – July 1971
 Cato Street (Young Vic) – 1971
The Good Natur'd Man (National) – 1971
Live Like Pigs (Royal Court Upstairs) – 1972
I Claudius (Queen's Theatre) – 1972
The Baker, the Baker's Wife and the Baker's Boy (Newcastle) – 1972
Rooted (Hampstead Theatre) – March 1973
Magnificence; Sweet Talk and The Merry-Go-Round (Royal Court) – 1973
Ashes (Open Space) – January 1974
The Corn is Green (Watford Palace) – 1974
Twelfth Night, director Peter Gill (RSC Stratford) – August 1974
Harding's Luck (Greenwich Theatre) – December 1974
Fish in the Sea (Half Moon Theatre) – February 1975
As You Like It (Nottingham Playhouse) – 1975
The Fool (Royal Court) – 1975
The Norman Conquests (Berlin) – 1976
Small Change, Peter Gill (Royal Court) – July 1976
As You Like It (opening of Riverside Studios) – May 1976
Ivanov, director David Jones (RSC Aldwych Theatre) – September 1976
The Cherry Orchard, director Peter Gill, (Riverside Studios) – January 1978
That Good Between Us (RSC Donmar Warehouse) – July 1977
Lavender Blue (National, Cottesloe) – November 1977
Touched (Nottingham Playhouse at the Old Vic) – September 1977
The World Turned Upside Down (National, Cottesloe) – 2 November 1978
Has 'Washington' Legs? (National, Cottesloe) – 29 November 1978
Billy Budd (The Metropolitan Opera House, New York) – 1978
Dispatches (National, Cottesloe) – 6 June 1979
Undiscovered Country (National, Olivier) – 20 June 1979
Lark Rise and Candleford (National, Cottesloe) – 1979
Don Quixote (National, Olivier) – 1982
Schweyk in the Second World War, Bertolt Brecht (National, Olivier) – 1982
Small Change (National, Cottesloe) – 1983
Cinderella, Pantomime (National, Lyttelton) – December 1983
The Mysteries: Doomsday/The Nativity/The Passion, designed and lit (National, Cottesloe; Lyceum Theatre) – 1985
The Party (RSC The Pit) – 1985
Richard III (RSC Barbican Theatre) – 1985
Today (RSC The Pit) – 1985
Mutiny, David Essex musical (Piccadilly Theatre) – 1985
The Critic/The Real Inspector Hound (National, Olivier) – 1985
Edmond, David Mamet (Royal Court) – 1985
The Merry Wives of Windsor (RSC Barbican Theatre) – 1986 and 1987
Futurists (National, Cottesloe) – 1986
Prairie du Chien/The Shawl (Royal Court Upstairs) – 1986
Kafka's Dick (Royal Court) – 1986
Country Dancing (RSC The Pit) – 1987
Richard II (RSC Barbican Theatre) – 1987
Entertaining Strangers (National, Cottesloe) – 1987
Girlfriends, Howard Goodall musical (Playhouse Theatre) – 1987
Waiting for Godot (National, Lyttelton) – 1987
Cat on a Hot Tin Roof (National, Lyttelton) – 1988
The Shaughran (National, Olivier) – 1988 and 1989
The Changeling (National, Lyttelton) – 1988
The Father, August Strindberg (National, Cottesloe) – 1988
The Voysey Inheritance (National, Cottesloe) – 1989
Cat on a Hot Tin Roof  (dir Howard Davies) New York – 1990
Lenny (dir Peter Hall) Queens Theatre - July 1999 
Amadeus (dir Peter Hall) Old Vic – October 1998; New York – 1999
Blue/Orange by Joe Penhall (dir Roger Michell), National Cottesloe – April 2000; Duchess Theatre – April 2001
All My Sons by Arthur Miller (dir Howard Davies) National Lyttelton – July 2000; National Lyttelton – August 2001
Entertaining Mr Sloane (dir Terry Johnson ) Arts Theatre – January 2001
The York Realist (written and dir Peter Gill) Royal Court – January 2002; Strand Theatre – March 2002
The Coast of Utopia: Voyage/Shipwreck/Salvage, trilogy by Tom Stoppard (dir Trevor Nunn) National – August 2002
The Breath of Life by David Hare (dir Howard Davies) Theatre Royal Haymarket – October 2002
Honour by Joanna Murray-Smith (dir Roger Michell) National Cottesloe – 2003Hitchcock Blonde (written and dir Terry Johnson) Royal Court and Lyric Theatre – 2003The Permanent Way by David Hare (dir Max Stafford Clark) National Cottesloe – January 2004 Cyrano de Bergerac (dir Howard Davies) National Olivier – April 2004Old Times by Harold Pinter (dir Roger Michell) Donmar Warehouse – July 2004The Woman in White musical by Andrew Lloyd Webber (dir Trevor Nunn) Palace Theatre – September 2004; New York – 2005Titus Andronicus (dir Lucy Bailey) Shakespeare's Globe – 2006The Beggar's Opera (dir Lucy Bailey) Open Air Theatre, Regent's Park – 2011Fortune's Fool (dir Lucy Bailey) The Old Vic – 2013.

Honours and awards
Awards include:

Critics' Circle Theatre Awards 2002, Best Designer for The Coast of Utopia Trilogy
Olivier Awards 2004, Olivier Award for Best Set Design for Hitchcock BlondeDudley was appointed Officer of the Order of the British Empire (OBE) in the 2021 New Year Honours for services to stage design.

References

BibliographyWho's Who in the Theatre (17th Edition), Gale (1981). .The National: The Theatre and its Work 1963–97 by Simon Callow, Nick Hern Books (1997). .Theatre Record and its annual Indexes.Stage Design'' by Tony Davis, Rotavision SA (2001). .

External links

British Theatre Guide interview, June 2003: "William Dudley, possibly Britain's top Theatre Designer"

1947 births
Living people
Artists from London
Alumni of the Slade School of Fine Art
English scenic designers
Laurence Olivier Award winners
Critics' Circle Theatre Award winners
Alumni of Saint Martin's School of Art
Officers of the Order of the British Empire